Akhmad-Khadzhi Abdulkhamidovich Kadyrov (23 August 1951 – 9 May 2004) was a Russian politician and revolutionary who served as Chief Mufti of the Chechen Republic of Ichkeria in the 1990s during and after the First Chechen War. At the outbreak of the Second Chechen War he switched sides, offering his service to the Russian government, and later became the President of the Chechen Republic from 5 October 2003, acting as head of administration since July 2000.

On 9 May 2004, he was assassinated by Chechen Islamists in Grozny, by a bomb blast during a Victory Day  memorial parade. His son, Ramzan Kadyrov, who led his father's militia, became his successor in March 2007 as the President of the Chechen Republic.

Early life

Akhmad Abdulkhamidovich Kadyrov was born in Karaganda in the Kazakh Soviet Socialist Republic on 23 August 1951 to a Chechen family that had been expelled from Chechnya during the deportation of the Chechens and Ingush. In April 1957, his family returned to Shalinsky District of the Chechen-Ingush ASSR. In 1980, he started studying Islam at Mir-i Arab Madrasah in Bukhara, and followed by studying at Islamic University in Tashkent, Uzbek SSR, from 1982 to 1986. In the early 1990s, he returned to Chechnya, and founded the Islamic Institute in the village of Kurchaloy.

First Chechen War 
Following the Chechen declaration of independence, he became a supporter of the president Dzhokhar Dudayev. Kadyrov fought prominently in the First Chechen War on the Chechen side as a militia commander. In 1995, he was appointed Chief Mufti of Chechen Republic of Ichkeria. Following the outbreak of violence between Moscow and Chechen separatists, Kadyrov declared that "There are a million Chechens, and 150 million Russians. If every Chechen kills 150 Russians, we will win."

Second Chechen War 

While the first war was mainly fought for nationalism, after the de facto independence of Chechnya, much of the Chechen forces by 1999 were jihadists, such as the Chechen Mujahideen. Kadyrov, as Chief Mufti, was critical of Wahhabism, to which many of the foreign fighters adhered.

Early in 1999, Kadyrov gave a speech before the armed militia telling them that the nation was behind them, that the recent outbreak of violence was the fault of Christian and foreign involvement, and that they should continue on fighting with persistence and trust.

But by the autumn of 1999, Kadyrov – a leading figure in the resistance movement – decided to abandon the insurgency and offered his support to the Russian federal forces in the Second Chechen War. Aslan Maskhadov immediately fired him from the Chief Mufti chair, although this decree was never accepted by Kadyrov, who abdicated himself a few months later due to his civilian chairman career. According to James Hughes, Kadyrov's U-turn may have been motivated partly by personal ambition and partly by a concern with the desperate condition of the Chechen population, and was also driven by a fear of the growing sectarian Wahhabi influence on the insurgency.

After the Russian forces seized control over Chechnya in June 2000, Kadyrov was appointed head of the administration of the Chechen Republic by the Russian president Vladimir Putin, an interim transitional office until a Constitution is applied, which was the predecessor office to the future office of the President of the Chechen Republic. On 5 October 2003, he was elected the first President of the Chechen Republic. In this position, he remained mainly pro-Moscow. He also advocated numerous amnesty campaigns for former rebel fighters, who were allowed to join Chechen police and loyalist militia forces if they surrendered. His chief personal bodyguard was Movladi Baisarov. Reportedly, there were at least a dozen assassination attempts against him before the final one.

Death and legacy

On 9 May 2004, an explosion ripped through the VIP seating at the Dinamo football stadium during a mid-morning Soviet Victory Day parade in the capital city of Grozny, instantly killing Kadyrov. Two of his bodyguards, the Chairman of the Chechen State Council, a Reuters journalist, and as many as a dozen others were also killed (a later report stated that more than 30 people had died). Some 56 others were wounded, including Colonel General Valery Baranov, the commander of Russian forces in Chechnya, who lost a leg in the explosion. The bomb was said to have been built into the concrete of a supporting column during recent repairs. The Islamist Chechen rebel leader Shamil Basayev later claimed that he had paid $50,000 for the attack.

Kadyrov had four children, two daughters (Zargan and Zulay) and two sons. His eldest son, Zelimkhan Kadyrov, died on 31 May 2004. His younger son, Ramzan Kadyrov, led his father's militia and was appointed prime minister and president of Chechnya in March 2007.

Both the Akhmad Kadyrov Mosque in Grozny, and the Akhmad Haji Kadyrov Mosque in the village of Abu Ghosh in Israel are named after him.

On 7 June 2017, the football club Terek Grozny was renamed to Akhmat Grozny in Kadyrov's honour.

See also
List of unsolved murders
Kadyrovites
Politics of Chechnya

Notes

References

External links

Akhmad Kadyrov: Had I been the dictator of Chechnya by Anna Politkovskaya, Novaya Gazeta, 22 March 2002
Obituary: Akhmad Kadyrov, BBC News, 9 May 2004
Obituary Akhmad Kadyrov, Chechen president widely seen as Moscow puppet, The Guardian, 10 May 2004
Obituaries: Akhmad Kadyrov, Russian-backed President of Chechnya, The Independent, 11 May 2004
Obituary in brief: Akhmad Kadyrov, president of Chechnya, The Economist, 19 May 2004
Russian documentary with video of last moments and explosion (in Russian, YouTube)

1951 births
2004 deaths
Assassinated Chechen politicians
Chechen field commanders
Chechen Islamists
Chechen people
Chechen warlords
Heroes of the Russian Federation
Male murder victims
People from Karaganda
People murdered in Russia
People of the Chechen wars
Politicians of Ichkeria
Heads of the Chechen Republic
Heads of the federal subjects of Russia who died in office
Russian imams
Russian Islamists
Russian Muslims
Russian people of Chechen descent
Russian Sufi religious leaders
Russian Sufis
Terrorism deaths in Russia
Unsolved murders in Russia